Thomas Carleton was a British Army officer and Canadian politician.

Thomas Carleton may also refer to:

Thomas Carleton (MP) for Morpeth

See also
Thomas Carlton (disambiguation)